A Box of Dreams is a limited edition 3-disc box set by Irish singer, songwriter and musician Enya, released on 1 December 1997 by WEA Records. The set was a companion release to her first compilation album Paint the Sky with Stars – The Best of Enya, released the previous month. A Box of Dreams contains 46 tracks from her 1987 debut album Enya to Paint the Sky with Stars across three discs, each thematically arranged: "Oceans" contains Enya's upbeat tracks, "Clouds" is a collection of her piano instrumentals, and "Stars" contains slow ballads and more atmospheric tracks. Four B-sides are included: "Oriel Window", "Morning Glory", "Willows on the Water" and "Eclipse". The calligraphy and design were done by Brody Neuenschwander.

Track listing

Disc one: Oceans

Disc two: Clouds

Disc three: Stars

Release history

Personnel
 Music composed by Enya
 Lyrics by Roma Ryan
 Produced by Nicky Ryan

References

External links
 The Enya Discography

Enya compilation albums
1997 compilation albums
Warner Music Group compilation albums